Generalate may refer to:

 Generalate (office), the office, rank, or position of a general
 Karlovac Generalate, a section of the Habsburg Military Frontier
 Varaždin Generalate, a section of the Habsburg Military Frontier
 colloquial term for a building hosting a General Staff

See also
 General (disambiguation)
 Palace of Slavonian General Command